Lotte is a municipality in the district of Steinfurt, in North Rhine-Westphalia, Germany.

Geography
Lotte is situated on the north side of the Teutoburg Forest, close to the border of Lower Saxony and approx. 10 km west of Osnabrück.

Division of the town
The municipality consists of 5 districts:
 Bueren
 Wersen
 Halen
 Alt Lotte
 Osterberg

Sports 

Well-known is the team of Sportfreunde Lotte. In 2016–17, they play 3. Liga (League) of German (association) football and on 8 Febr 2017, they have reached the participation of cup quarterfinals in 2016–17 DFB-Pokal.

References

External links

  

Steinfurt (district)